The LLNL RISE process was an experimental shale oil extraction technology developed by the Lawrence Livermore National Laboratory. The name comes from the abbreviation of the  Lawrence Livermore National Laboratory and words 'rubble in situ extraction'.

LLNL RISE is a modified in situ extraction technology originally proposed by Rio Blanco Oil Shale Co. and developed by the Lawrence Livermore National Laboratory.  It is classified as an internal combustion technology.  The process was described in 1975 by Lewis A. E. and A. J. Rothman.

In the LLNL RISE process a part of the oil shale deposit (roughly 20% of the total deposit) is removed by the conventional mining technique. The remaining deposit is then broken up with explosives to increase porosity of the deposit. The retort chamber is ignited  at the top. The combustion zone moves downward as an oxygen gas provided, similar to the process developed by the Occidental Petroleum. The heat causes retorting process converting kerogen in oil shale to oil shale gas and shale oil vapors. Some oil is collected at the bottom of the retort, other collected at the surface as vapors.

The process was never used commercially. It was tested by using experimental  simulated retort with capacity of 6 tonnes of oil shale per day.

References

Oil shale technology
Thermal treatment
Lawrence Livermore National Laboratory